Match penalty is a term used in some sports for a player having committed such a serious offense that he or she is being sent off for the rest of the game. The term is used in bandy, floorball, and ice hockey.

Bandy 
In bandy, it is indicated with a red penalty card.

Ice hockey 
In ice hockey, there are two kinds of sending-off penalties: “game misconduct penalty” and the more serious “match penalty” which is imposed for deliberately injuring another player as well as attempting to injure another player. Many other penalties automatically become match penalties if injuries actually occur: under NHL rules, butt-ending, goalies using blocking glove to the face of another player, head-butting, kicking, punching an unsuspecting player, spearing, and tape on hands during altercation must be called as a match penalty if injuries occur; under IIHF rules, kneeing and checking to the head or neck area must be called as a match penalty if injuries occur.

References

Sports terminology